Novopsocus caeciliae is a species of Novopsocus from New Guinea known from a single male thus far, found in the lowlands near Baitabag, Madang Province. Its hypandrium is similar to that of Novopsocus magnus, and thus differs from the hypandrium of Novopsocus stenopterus. It is the smallest of all three Novopsocus species (~2.5 mm long).

References 

 Thornton, I. W. B. 1984. An unusual psocopteran from new Guinea and its relationships within the Philotarsidae. International journal of entomology. 26: 378-385.
 Cuénoud, P. 2008. A revision of the New Guinean genus Novopsocus Thornton (Psocoptera, Pseudocaeciliidae) with the description of two new species. Revue Suisse de Zoologie. 115 : 331-340

Pseudocaeciliidae
Insects of New Guinea